Stripe, Inc. is an Irish-American financial services and software as a service (SaaS) company dual-headquartered in South San Francisco, California, United States and Dublin, Ireland. The company primarily offers payment-processing software and application programming interfaces for e-commerce websites and mobile applications.

History 

Irish entrepreneur brothers John and Patrick Collison founded Stripe in Palo Alto, California, in 2009. In 2011, the company received investment of $2 million, including from PayPal co-founders Elon Musk and Peter Thiel, Irish entrepreneur Liam Casey, and venture capital firms Sequoia Capital, Andreessen Horowitz, and SV Angel.

In March 2013, Stripe made its first acquisition, Kickoff, a chat and task-management application. 

In 2012, the company moved from Palo Alto to San Francisco. In October 2019, the company announced that it would be moving from the South of Market area to Oyster Point in the neighbouring city of South San Francisco in 2021.

In February 2021, former Governor of the Bank of England, Mark Carney, was appointed to the Stripe board.

On October 20, 2021, Stripe acquired accountancy platform Recko; Recko’s solution was to be added to Stripe’s existing suite of financial tools.

In January 2022, Stripe entered a five-year partnership with Ford Motor Company; through this deal, Stripe will handle transactions for consumer vehicle orders and reservations. That same month, Stripe partnered with Spotify to help creators monetize subscriptions, accept payments and launch recurring revenue streams. In April 2022, Twitter announced that it will partner with Stripe Inc (digital payments' processor) for piloting cryptocurrency payouts for limited users in the platform. “The crypto payments will be routed through Stripe Connect, which will also handle KYC requirements”, Stripe said. The company announced it is also planning to add options for payment in other cryptocurrencies in the future.

In April 2022, Stripe announced its strategic partnership with UK-based FinTech company ION.

The Wall Street Journal reported in July 2022 that the company's internal share price had fallen, causing its implied valuation to drop from $95billion to $74 billion. In November 2022, the company announced it intended to initiate layoffs, terminating some 14% of their workforce.

Services

Payment processing 
Stripe provides application programming interfaces that web developers can use to integrate payment processing into their websites and mobile applications. The company introduced Stripe Connect in 2012, a multiparty payments solution that lets software developers embed payments natively into their products.

In April 2018, the company released antifraud tools, branded "Radar", that block fraudulent transactions.

In 2018, the company expanded its services to include a billing product for online businesses, allowing businesses to manage subscription recurring revenue and invoicing.

On June 11, 2019, Stripe's point-of-sale service, called Terminal, was made available to U.S. users. Terminal had previously been invitation-only. Terminal is currently available in Canada, France, Germany, Ireland, the Netherlands, Singapore, and the United Kingdom. The service offers physical credit-card readers designed to work with Stripe. 

On September 5, 2019, Stripe launched a merchant cash-advance scheme called Stripe Capital. The scheme allows Stripe merchants to request an advance on future payments they expect to process through their Stripe merchant account.

In June 2021, the company launched Stripe Tax, which lets businesses automatically calculate and collect sales tax, VAT, and GST in over 30 countries and all US states.

In May 2021, Stripe introduced Payment Links, a no-code product allowing businesses to create a link to a checkout page and begin accepting payments on social platforms or direct channels.

In January 2022, Stripe agreed to acquire Terminal manufacturing partner BBPOS, allowing the company to bring the hardware development of Terminal readers in-house. In February, Stripe was announced as Apple’s first partner on in-person Tap to Pay, which enables businesses to accept contactless payments using an iPhone and a partner-enabled iOS app.

In May 2022, Stripe announced Data Pipeline, a tool for Stripe users who store data with Amazon Redshift or Snowflake Data Cloud. Data Pipeline syncs Stripe data and reports with Amazon Redshift or Snowflake Data Cloud, where they can be queried in combination with other business information. That month, the company also introduced Stripe Financial Connections, enabling businesses to establish direct connections with their customers’ bank accounts to verify accounts for payments and payouts, check balances to reduce payment failures, and cut fraud by confirming bank account ownership.

Corporate finance 
On February 24, 2016, the company launched the Atlas platform to help startups register as U.S. corporations. The platform originally launched as invitation-only. In March 2016, Cuba was added to the list of countries covered under the program. Companies registered using Atlas can be Delaware-based C corporations, or, as of April 30, 2018, limited liability companies.

In July 2018, Stripe the company introduced Stripe Issuing, a product that allows online businesses and platforms to create their own physical and digital credit and debit cards.

Other
In 2018, Stripe started a publishing company named Stripe Press to promote ideas that support businesses.

In 2019, Stripe began offering loans and credit cards to businesses in the United States. The company stated that loans are approved automatically using machine-learning models, with no human intervention. The following year, the company introduced Stripe Treasury, which provides its platform users APIs to embed financial services, allowing their customers to send, receive, and store funds.

In October 2020, Stripe announced Stripe Climate, a service for businesses to fund atmospheric carbon research and capture. In 2022, Stripe started a new subsidiary called Frontier that would direct spending on carbon removal. It announced $925 million in funding from major silicon valley companies to fund start up companies performing carbon capture to kick-start the industry.

Stripe Identity, launched in June 2021, enables online businesses to verify user identities, and is built on the same infrastructure used for Stripe’s own risk and compliance program.

Growth 
In May 2011, Stripe received a $2 million investment from venture capitalists Peter Thiel, Elon Musk, Sequoia Capital, SV Angel, and Andreessen Horowitz. Stripe launched publicly in September 2011 after an extensive private beta.

In 2020 Stripe expanded its services to five new European markets: the Czech Republic, Romania, Bulgaria, Cyprus, and Malta.  

On October 15, 2020, Stripe acquired Paystack, a Nigerian payment processor, in a deal reportedly worth over $200 million, with the aim of expanding its services into Africa.

In December 2020, Stripe announced plans to expand in Southeast Asia, China, India, and Japan. It increased its staff in the region by 200 employees.

In March 2021, Stripe raised another $600 million, reaching a valuation of $95 billion, aimed towards expanding their European headquarters.

In April 2021, Stripe acquired TaxJar, a provider of cloud-based tax services based in Massachusetts. Whilst details of the acquisition were not made public, the deal is thought to have been in the region of $200M.

Investments 
Stripe is reported to have participated in two funding rounds for Monzo, a "challenger bank" based in the U.K. Stripe's first investment in Monzo was reported on November 6, 2017, with a second investment in Monzo's Series E fundraising round reported on October 10, 2018. Monzo's valuation grew from approximately $350 million to $1.27 billion through these two rounds of fundraising. Stripe participated in a third round of funding for Monzo on June 24, 2019, which raised approximately $144 million in funding for Monzo at a valuation of approximately $2.5 billion.

Stripe has invested in companies offering similar services as themselves, but in different geographical regions. In August 2018, Stripe invested in PayStack, a Nigerian payment processor, and, in September 2019, invested in PayMongo, a Philippine payment processor. In February 2021, Stripe invested in Safepay, a Pakistani payment processor.

On June 6, 2019, Stripe led a $22.5 million fundraising round for Step, a financial services startup offering fee-free bank accounts to teenagers.

On March 26, 2020, Stripe led a $20 million Series A fundraising round for Fast, a company creating a universal, one-click checkout service. Subsequently, Stripe led a $102 million Series B fundraising round for Fast on January 26, 2021. Fast shut down in April 2022.

See also 
 Electronic commerce
 List of online payment service providers
 Payment gateway
 Payment service provider
 Subscription business model

References

Further reading

External links 
 
 How I Built This—Stripe: Patrick and John Collison (audio interview)

2009 establishments in California
Business software
Companies based in South San Francisco, California
Companies based in Dublin (city)
Financial technology
Merchant services
Online payments
Payment service providers
Web applications
Y Combinator companies